Rimosodaphnella brunneolineata is a species of sea snail, a marine gastropod mollusk in the family Raphitomidae.

Description
The length of the shell reaches 8 mm.

Distribution
This marine species occurs off Mactan Island, Cebu, Philippines

References

External links
 Bonfitto, A.; Morassi, M. (2013). New Indo-Pacific species of Rimosodaphnella Cossmann, 1916 (Gastropoda: Conoidea): a genus of probable Tethyan origin. Molluscan Research. 33(4): 230-236.
 Gastropods.com: Rimosodaphnella brunneolineata

brunneolineata
Gastropods described in 2013